Lahn is a dispersed settlement in the Oberpinzgau, the upper Salzach valley and the district of Zell am See/Pinzgau, and a village in the municipality of Wald im Pinzgau, on the southern rim of the Kitzbühel Alps.

Geography 
In addition the village has a halt, Lahnsiedlung, on the Pinzgauer Lokalbahn,  the Postbus line 670 Zell am See – Krimml stops in the Finksiedlung.

Also part of the village are the eastern slopes of the Trattenbach valley – the western slopes belong to Rosental (Gemeinde Neukirchen) – to the north, with the alpine meadows of Besensteinalm, Wurfgrundalm, Wurf-Hochalm, Happingalm, Happing Hochalm on the Gernkogel and Trattenbachalm, Trattenbach-Hochalm on the Kröndlhorn.

History 
Hinterwaldberg lies on the old bridle path  from Mittersill, the trading centre, over the Gerlos Pass (Pinzgauer Höhe) to Zell am Ziller. It was upgraded in 1631 to a cart track. In 1962 the new Gerlos Alpine Road (today part of the B 165 from Mittersill to Hainzenberg), via Krimml, was opened. It was planned by Dipl. Ing. Franz Wallack, the builder of the Großglockner High Alpine Road. As a result, the Old Gerlos Road (Alte Gerlosstraße) lost its importance.

Tourism and places of interest 
The Arno Way (Arnoweg) runs through this village after crossing the River Salzach near Orgler en route from the Hinterwaldberg. It then climbs uphill to the Pinzgau Ridgeway above Lahn and continues to the Vorderwaldberg.

References 

Wald im Pinzgau
Zell am See District
Kitzbühel Alps